Tigliane is a diterpene that forms the structural basis for some natural chemical compounds such as phorbol.

See also 
 Abietane
 Labdane
 Ingenane
 Phorbol esters
 Tigilanol tiglate

References

Diterpenes
Cyclopropanes
Cyclopentanes
Tetracyclic compounds